Xenomeris is a genus of fungi in the family Venturiaceae.

Species 

X. abietis
X. acicola
X. alpina
X. arbuti
X. eucalypti
X. hemisphaerica
X. juniperi
X. nicholsonii
X. pruni
X. raetica
X. saccifolii

References

External links 

 Xenomeris at Index Fungorum

Venturiaceae